The Amendment 774 of 2006, also known as Alabama Sanctity of Marriage Amendment, is an amendment to the Alabama Constitution that makes it unconstitutional for the state to recognize or perform same-sex marriages or civil unions.  The legislature passed Alabama Act 2005-35, which placed this amendment on the election ballot.  The referendum was approved by 81% of the voters.

Contents
The text of the amendment states:

Results
The vote for the amendment took place on 6 June 2006.

Legislative repeal attempts 

Representative Patricia Todd introduced bills to repeal Amendment 774 in 2014 and 2015. These bills died in committee.

Searcy v. Strange
On January 23, 2015, Chief Judge on the United States District Court for the Southern District of Alabama Callie V. Granade issued a ruling striking down Alabama's ban on same-sex marriage as violations of the Fourteenth Amendment's guarantees of equal protection and due process.  Alabama supreme court justice Roy S. Moore ordered Alabama's probate judges to ignore Granade's ruling.

See also
LGBT rights in Alabama
Same-sex marriage in Alabama

External links

 The Money Behind the 2006 Marriage Amendments - National Institute on Money in State Politics. Archived from the original.

References

U.S. state constitutional amendments banning same-sex unions
2006 in LGBT history
LGBT in Alabama
2006 Alabama elections
2006 ballot measures
Alabama amendments
2006